The 1946–47 season saw Rochdale compete for their 19th season in the Football League Third Division North, and the first after World War 2. The schedule was identical to the abandoned 1939–40 season.

Statistics
																

|}

Final league table

Competitions

Football League Third Division North

F.A. Cup

Lancashire Cup

References

Rochdale A.F.C. seasons
Rochdale